Final Embrace is a 1992 American film.

Plot
A pop singer is killed. A detective investigates.

Cast
Robert Rusler as Kyle Lambton
Nancy Valen as Candy Vale / Laurel Parrish
Dick Van Patten as Larch
Dee McCafferty as Adrian Waring
Linda Dona as Jeri
Wally Kurth

External links

1992 films
1992 thriller films
American thriller films
1990s English-language films
1990s American films